Tamunonengiye-Ofori (Nengi) Ossai (born 13 July 1975) is a track and field sprint athlete who competes as a Masters athlete for Great Britain. He was a double gold medallist at the 2015 World Masters Athletics Championships, winning both the 100 metres and 200 metres in the men's under-40 category.

Statistics

Personal bests

100 meters progression

200 meters progression

References

Living people
1975 births
British male sprinters
British masters athletes